

This is intended to be a complete list of the properties and districts on the National Register of Historic Places in Kenton County, Kentucky, United States. The locations of National Register properties and districts for which the latitude and longitude coordinates are included below, may be seen in a map.

There are 66 properties and districts listed on the National Register in the county; 2 of these are National Historic Landmarks.  Another property was once listed but has been removed.

Current listings

|}

Former listing

|}

See also

 List of National Historic Landmarks in Kentucky
 National Register of Historic Places listings in Kentucky

References

Kenton